Victoria Bulitko (Ukrainian: Булітко Вікторія Сергіївна; born 25 January 1983) is a Ukrainian film, television and theater actress.

Biography
Bulitko was born on 25 January 1983 in Zaporizhzhia, Ukrainian SSR, USSR. She graduated from the theater department of Zaporizhzhia National University, specializing in film and theater acting. She has appeared in over 30 films and television shows. She is also a well known as member of "Diezel Studio".

Filmography
2012 – "Diamond Cross" (film) 
2012 – "Diary of a pregnant woman" (main) (TV) Season 1 
2012 – "Three Sisters" (main) (TV) season 4–6 
2011 – "Three Sisters" (main) (TV) season 1–3
2011 – "The route of mercy" (TV series)
2011 – "Tales Mityaya" (TV series)
2010 – "Pretty Woman" (main) (TV) 
2010 – "According to the law" (TV series)
2010 – "Return of Mukhtar 2" (TV series)
2009 – "Muhtar's return" (TV series)
2009 – "World of Sony" (TV series)
2009 – "Dureyter" (TV series)
2008 – "Escape from New Life" comedy (film)
2008 – "Danger envy" (TV series)
2008 – "Aliens mistakes" (TV series)
2007 – "Veseli usmіshki" (TV series) (Ukraine)

Theatre

References

External links

  Victoria Bulitko – Official Website 
 
 Actress' profile on the Podol Theatre's website

Living people
21st-century Ukrainian women singers
Ukrainian singer-songwriters
Ukrainian television presenters
Ukrainian film actresses
Ukrainian stage actresses
21st-century Ukrainian actresses
ICTV (Ukraine) people
Recipients of the title of People's Artists of Ukraine
Actors from Zaporizhzhia
Ukrainian women television presenters
1983 births